A general election was held in the U.S. state of Connecticut on November 4, 2014. All of Connecticut's executive officers were up for election as well as all of Connecticut's five seats in the United States House of Representatives. Primary elections were held on August 26, 2014.

Governor and lieutenant governor

Incumbent Democratic Governor Dannel Malloy and Lieutenant Governor Nancy Wyman are running for re-election to a second term in office. The Republican nominees are former U.S. Ambassador to Ireland and nominee for governor in 2010 Thomas C. Foley and Groton Town Councilor Heather Bond Somers.

Attorney General
Incumbent Democratic Attorney General George Jepsen is running for re-election to a second term in office.

The Republican nominee is attorney and candidate for the U.S. Senate in 2012 Kie Westby. Also running is Stephen Fournier of the Green Party, an attorney and former member of the Hartford Board of Education who was his party's nominee for Connecticut's 1st congressional district in 2008 and for attorney general in 2010.

Polling

Results

Secretary of the State
Incumbent Democratic Secretary of the State Denise Merrill is running for re-election to a second term in office.

The Republican nominee is Peter Lumaj, an Albanian-born attorney and candidate for the U.S. Senate in 2012. Also running is Mike DeRosa of the Green Party, a perennial candidate for public office.

Polling

Results

Treasurer
Incumbent Democratic State Treasurer Denise L. Nappier is running for re-election to a fifth term in office.

The Republican nominee is Timothy Herbst, an attorney and the Trumbull Town First Selectman. Financier, movie producer and political activist Bob Eick had also been running for the Republican nomination. At the Republican State Convention on May 17, Herbst won the endorsement with 70.3% of the vote to Eick's 29.6%. Despite Eick having polled enough votes to appear on the primary ballot, he withdrew and did not force a primary election.

Rolf Maurer of the Green Party, a perennial candidate for public office, is running a write-in campaign. He is also the Green Party nominee for comptroller.

Polling

Results

Comptroller
Incumbent Democratic State Comptroller Kevin Lembo is running for re-election to a second term in office.

Two Republicans ran for their party's nomination: Marine Corps veteran and former Republican legislative intern Angel Cadena and accountant Sharon J. McLaughlin. At the Republican State Convention on May 17, McLaughlin won the endorsement with 63.8% of the vote. Cadena received 36.1%, assuring him of a place on the primary ballot.

Also running is Rolf Maurer of the Green Party, a perennial candidate for public office, who is also running a write-in campaign for treasurer.

Polling

Results

United States House of Representatives

All of Connecticut's five seats in the United States House of Representatives were up for election in 2014. The Democratic Party won all of them. No districts changed hands.

References